Vexillum terebelloides is an extinct species of sea snail, a marine gastropod mollusk, in the family Costellariidae, the ribbed miters.

Distribution
Fossils of this marine species were found in Eocene strata in Picardy, France.

References

 Cossmann (M.), 1907 - Catalogue illustré des coquilles fossiles de l'Éocène des environs de Paris (4ème appendice). Annales de la Société royale Zoologique et Malacologique de Belgique, t. 41, p. 186-286
 Cossmann (M.) & Pissarro (G.), 1911 - Iconographie complète des coquilles fossiles de l'Éocène des environs de Paris, t. 2, p. pl. 26-45
 Le Renard, J. & Pacaud, J. (1995). Révision des mollusques Paléogènes du Bassin de Paris. II. Liste des références primaires des espèces. Cossmanniana. 3: 65–132.
 Pacaud (J.-M.), 2007 - Nouveautés nomenclaturales et taxonomiques introduites par Alcide d'Orbigny dans le Prodrome (1850, 1852) pour les espèces du Paléocène et de l'Eocène. Geodiversitas, t. 29, vol. 1, p. 17-85, fig. 1-14

External links
 Orbigny A. D. d'. (1850-1852). Prodrome de paléontologie stratigraphique universelle des animaux mollusques et rayonnés, faisant suite au cours élémentaire de paléontologie et de géologie stratigraphiques. Paris: Masson. vol. 1

terebelloides
Gastropods described in 1850